The Hamodava Coffee Company is a beverage manufacturer based in Auckland, New Zealand. Hamodava distributes exclusively Fair Trade and Organic certified products. Salvation Army officer Herbert Booth started the business in Melbourne, Australia in 1897 and ran it until its closure in 1929. Hamodava was relaunched by The Salvation Army in September 2016, with the company's operations being moved to Auckland.

History 
Herbert Henry Howard Booth, a Salvation Army officer and son of its cofounder William Booth, was appointed to the command of the organization's operations in Australia and New Zealand. Booth founded the Hamodava Tea Company in 1897 along with Ashley Lamb as a means to provide funds to support the work of The Salvation Army. Lamb sourced tea from Sri Lanka and blended and packed the product for retail in Melbourne. With the success of the original product, Hamodava also introduced a cocoa and a coffee product to the line two years later. The Hamodava Tea Company continued trading up until 1929 when international tea prices collapsed, and with the onset of the Great Depression the company was disbanded.

Hamodava comes from the Sinhalese word for 'army'. Hamodava pioneered ethical fair trade practices. The company sought to pay a fair price to the farmers who grew the produce and developed a scheme by which the farmers could make payments towards purchasing plantations from The Salvation Army.

In September 2016, The Salvation Army relaunched Hamodava.

Hamodava Café 
The Hamodava Cafe is situated on Bourke Street in Melbourne, Australia. The cafe operates out of a heritage building that once housed the original company in the late 1800s. It is a community centre providing breakfast and lunch.

References

External links 
 Official website

Food manufacturers of Australia
Food manufacturers of New Zealand
Food and drink companies based in Auckland
Food and drink companies based in Melbourne
Food and drink companies established in 1897
New Zealand brands
Manufacturing companies based in Auckland
Manufacturing companies based in Melbourne
Australian companies established in 1897
New Zealand companies established in 2016